The banded mud moray (Gymnothorax chlamydatus) is a moray eel found in coral reefs in the western Pacific Ocean (Taiwan and Indonesia). It was first named by Snyder in 1908, because of dark bands along its body.

References

External links
 

banded mud moray eel
Fish of Taiwan
Fish of Indonesia
banded mud moray eel